João Nuno de Lacerda Teixeira de Melo (Joane, Vila Nova de Famalicão, 18 March 1966), commonly known as Nuno Melo, is a Portuguese lawyer, conservative politician and Member of the European Parliament (MEP) representing the Democratic and Social Centre – People's Party (CDS-PP), of which he is its president.

Career

Member of the Portuguese Parliament, 1999–2009
Melo was a member of the Assembly of the Republic for the 8th, 9th and 10th legislative terms, and in 2004 chaired the 13th parliamentary enquiry into the 1980 Camarate air crash in which the Portuguese Prime Minister and the Minister of Defence died.

Member of the European Parliament, 2009–present
Melo has been a Member of the European Parliament since the 2009 elections. He first served on the Committee on Civil Liberties, Justice and Home Affairs before moving to the Committee on Agriculture and Rural Development in 2014. In addition, he has been a member of the parliament's delegations to the Euro-Latin American Parliamentary Assembly and to the Mercosur. During the parliamentary term from 2009 to 2014, Melo ranked second for the number of parliamentary questions asked to the European Commission (1,434).

Ahead of the 2014 European elections, the PSD named Melo second on their list, after Paulo Rangel. From 2016 until 2017, he was part of the Parliament's Committee of Inquiry into Money Laundering, Tax Avoidance and Tax Evasion (PANA) that investigated the Panama Papers revelations and tax avoidance schemes more broadly.

President of the CDS-PP, 2022–present 
After a poor showing in the 2021 Portuguese local elections, Melo decided to advance with a candidacy for the CDS party's leadership against the incumbent president Francisco Rodrigues dos Santos.

Although, after the Assembly of the Republic was dissolved due to the inability of the Socialist Government to pass a budget, which meant there were going to be elections soon, Rodrigues dos Santos canceled the 29th Congress in a generally controversial move, which led to many prominent figures leaving the party.

After a defeat in the 2022 Portuguese legislative election, where for the first time in its history CDS got no seats in parliament, Rodrigues dos Santos resigned as leader and the new congress was set to April. Backed by big figures associated with the party, such as former president Paulo Portas, Melo won the party's leadership with 73% of the votes, becoming the 11th president of the CDS-PP.

References

External links
  
 

1966 births
Living people
CDS – People's Party politicians
Members of the Assembly of the Republic (Portugal)
MEPs for Portugal 2009–2014
MEPs for Portugal 2014–2019
MEPs for Portugal 2019–2024